The HBO television sitcom Curb Your Enthusiasm premiered with an hour-long special on October 17, 1999. It was followed by a ten-episode first season that began airing on October 15, 2000.

The series was created by Larry David, who stars as a fictionalized version of himself. The series follows Larry in his life as a well-off, semi-retired television writer and producer in Los Angeles. Also starring are Cheryl Hines as his much younger wife, Cheryl; Jeff Garlin as his best friend and manager, Jeff; and Susie Essman as Jeff's wife, Susie. Curb Your Enthusiasm features many celebrity guest star appearances, fictionalized to varying degrees.

In June 2020, the series was renewed for an eleventh season, which premiered on October 24, 2021.

Series overview

Episodes

Special (1999)

Season 1 (2000)
The first season introduces Larry's post-Seinfeld world, where he is wealthy, has a loving wife and a best friend, and manages to offend many people around him.

Season 2 (2001)
Larry David pursues a new television project, first with Jason Alexander, and then Julia Louis-Dreyfus after Jason offends him. Based on Alexander's frustration with his own post-Seinfeld career/life, the premise is about an actor who starred in a megahit sitcom who finds it difficult to maintain a steady career afterward because of the public's perception of typecasting. Larry pitches the idea to various networks, but eventually ends up alienating or offending everyone he makes a deal with, and anyone else attached to the project.

Season 3 (2002)
Larry joins a restaurant venture with a group of investors; among them are Ted Danson and Michael York. A few subplots involve Larry being cast in a Martin Scorsese movie; an on again, off again feud with Stu and Susan Braudy; and Larry getting a pubic hair stuck in his throat.

Season 4 (2004)
Larry works with Mel Brooks, Ben Stiller, Cady Huffman and David Schwimmer to star on Broadway in The Producers. Larry struggles to fulfill his wife's tenth anniversary present to him—a one-time-only act of adultery.

Season 5 (2005)
Larry's friend Richard needs a kidney transplant operation. Purely out of paranoid guilt, Larry offers one of his own to Richard if Richard cannot find a suitable donor in time. Larry then makes many concerted, ridiculous efforts to find Richard another kidney donor. Larry explores the possibility that he may have been adopted, because of a potentially misunderstood word his father said (and no longer remembers) while in the hospital—Larry hires a private investigator (Mekhi Phifer) to look into it. Eventually, he discovers the "truth" and visits his potential biological family, where he learns that he could be a gentile. His new faith in Christianity makes him agree to donating Richard his kidney.

Season 6 (2007)
Cheryl and Larry shelter a New Orleans family named the Blacks (Vivica A. Fox and J. B. Smoove) in their house after a hurricane destroyed the Blacks' home. A distracted phone call between Larry and Cheryl causes her to re-evaluate their marriage dynamic and leave him; Larry thus returns to the dating scene.

Guest stars include: Steve Coogan, Michael McKean, Lucy Lawless, Tim Meadows, Mayim Bialik, Gina Gershon, John McEnroe, Barbara Boxer, John Legend, Diedrich Bader, and Ken Jeong.

Season 7 (2009)
Larry and Loretta are in a relationship, which Larry soon realizes is not working for him. She is diagnosed with cancer and breaks up with Larry because she thinks he is cheating on her. She and the rest of the family leave Larry's home—except for Leon, who stays with him. When Larry runs into Cheryl for the first time since last season, he learns that she appreciated him more when he had a job, so he accepts NBC's offer for a Seinfeld reunion show to give her a part in it and win her back.

Guest stars include: Jerry Seinfeld, Julia Louis-Dreyfus, Jason Alexander, Michael Richards, Christian Slater, Richard Kind, Philip Baker Hall, Rosie O'Donnell, Catherine O'Hara, Elisabeth Shue, Meg Ryan, David Spade, Jillian Bell, Randall Park, and Eric Andre.

Season 8 (2011)
Larry finalizes his divorce from Cheryl and enjoys life as a single man. In order to avoid a charity gig, he goes with Jeff and Susie on a three-month trip to New York City, where he soon reunites with Leon.

Guest stars include: Ricky Gervais, Rosie O'Donnell, Michael J. Fox, Gary Cole, Larry Miller, Harry Hamlin, Michael McKean, Amy Landecker, Ana Gasteyer, and Michael Bloomberg.

Season 9 (2017)
Larry incurs a fatwa from the Supreme Leader of Iran, Ayatollah Ali Khamenei, after lampooning the Ayatollahs while appearing on Jimmy Kimmel Live! to promote his latest, long-awaited project, a comedy musical called Fatwa!, centered on The Satanic Verses controversy, in which Ayatollah Khomeini ordered a fatwa against Salman Rushdie in 1989.

Season 10 (2020)
Larry is accused of sexual harassment by his assistant Alice and his attempts to control the situation only serve to make things worse. At the same time, Larry intends to open his own coffee shop, which he calls a spite store, right next to Mocha Joe's out of spite, regarding petty grievances.

Season 11 (2021)
After a burglar drowns in Larry's pool, the police inform Larry he must have a  fence around his pool. The burglar's brother, Marcos, extorts Larry by threatening to sue him, unless Larry casts Marcos' daughter, Maria Sofia, in his new Netflix show about himself in his 20s. Maria Sofia lacks acting skills, so Larry seeks to have the fence law changed. He does so by beginning a relationship with an unattractive, unpleasant councilwoman, so he can eject Maria Sofia from his show. Leon breaks up with his girlfriend Mary Ferguson after purchasing non-refundable plane tickets to Asia for the pair. Leon tries to find another woman with the same name to replace his ex on the trip.

Notes

References

External links
 
 

 
Lists of American sitcom episodes